The Fairey Hamble Baby was a British single-seat naval patrol floatplane designed and built by Fairey Aviation for the Royal Naval Air Service

Design and development
Fairey Aviation built a number of Sopwith Baby floatplanes at its Hamble works. A variant of the Sopwith Baby was built by the Fairey Aviation Co., Ltd. On 23 October 1916, Sopwith Baby No.8134 was sent to the Fairey works for repair, and the opportunity was taken to rebuild the aircraft to incorporate a number of modifications. The most significant was the Fairey Patent Camber Gear, which was a form of trailing edge flap used to increase lift. On the Fairey-built aircraft, the entire trailing edge of each wing was hinged along the rear spar, lowered by rotating a handwheel in the cockpit. A differential device ensured that the flaps could still be actuated as ailerons; thus, lateral control was maintained. In this modified form, the aircraft was known as the Fairey Hamble Baby. Production Hamble Babies differed in appearance from those built by Sopwith and Blackburn. The planform of wings and tailplane were changed: the wings had increased span and reduced chord, had rounded tips, and the tailplane had a characteristic shape different from the semi-circular outline of the Sopwith original. A new and angular fin, Fairey-designed main floats of new form, and an enlarged tail float were fitted, and the engine cowling was modified. Parnall also produced Hamble Babies, which had some detail differences from the Fairey produced aircraft. The last 74 aircraft were produced by Parnall as landplanes and known as the Hamble Baby Convert.

Operators

Hellenic Navy

Royal Air Force
No. 219 Squadron RAF
No. 225 Squadron RAF
No. 229 Squadron RAF
No. 249 Squadron RAF
No. 253 Squadron RAF
No. 263 Squadron RAF
Royal Naval Air Service

Specifications (110 hp Clerget)

See also

References

Notes

Bibliography

 
 

Floatplanes
Hamble Baby
Biplanes
Single-engined tractor aircraft
Rotary-engined aircraft